Charles Herbert Simpson (28 August 1887 – 12 June 1963) was an Australian politician who was a member of the Legislative Council of Western Australia from 1946 until his death. He served as a minister in the government of Ross McLarty.

Simpson was born near Yanac, Victoria, to Mary Ann (née Stone) and John Michael Simpson. He moved to Western Australia at a young age, and in 1905 went to the Murchison goldfields, living at Youanmi for a period. Simpson lived in Rhodesia from 1914 to 1916, and then enlisted in the British Army, serving in England with the Royal Engineers. He returned to Australia after the war's end, initially living in Paynesville and later working as a storekeeper and land agent in Pindar.

At the 1946 Legislative Council elections, Simpson won a seat in Central Province for the Liberal Party. He became a government whip in 1948, and after the 1950 state election was appointed Minister for Transport, Minister for Railways, and Minister for Mines. Simpson served in cabinet until the McLarty government's defeat at the 1953 state election. He was leader of the Liberal Party in the Legislative Council from 1955 until 1958, when he instead joined the Country Party. Simpson died in office in June 1963, aged 75. He had married Neta Annice Matyr in 1921, with whom he had two daughters.

References

|-

|-

1887 births
1963 deaths
British Army personnel of World War I
Liberal Party of Australia members of the Parliament of Western Australia
Members of the Western Australian Legislative Council
National Party of Australia members of the Parliament of Western Australia
People from Victoria (Australia)
Royal Engineers soldiers